Pryde Brown (born 1935) is an American photographer and feminist best known for her portrait and wedding photography. She became the owner of her photography studio in Princeton, NJ, in 1970, and was an active member of the National Organization for Women and Women on Words and Images.

Personal life

Brown graduated from Sweet Briar College in June 1956. She married creative nonfiction writer John McPhee less than a year after graduating, on March 16, 1957. The couple had four children: photographer Laura McPhee, writers Jenny McPhee and Martha McPhee, and architectural historian Sarah McPhee. During her marriage to McPhee, Brown was a traditional stay-at-home mother and wife, despite harboring a desire to be a writer. Brown and McPhee divorced in 1969 when Brown was 32. She subsequently married Texan psychologist Dan Sullivan and had a fifth daughter, Joan Sullivan. The family, which consisted of Brown, Sullivan, Sullivan's children from his first marriage, Brown's daughters from her first marriage, and their youngest daughter Joan, lived together on Sullivan's farm in New Jersey. While married to Sullivan, Brown became the primary breadwinner. As of 2017, Brown was diagnosed with dementia.

Career 
Brown had dreams of being a career woman from a young age, although her exact ambition frequently shifted. While in college and then while married to McPhee, she wanted to be a writer, and also considered becoming a Chinese historian. She worked on a novel and received a grant from the New Jersey State Council on the Arts to support the project, although it was never finished.

In 1970, Brown began her long-term career: photography. Brown was introduced to photography as a young girl when her father gifted her a 35 millimeter Bolsa camera. When Brown's friend Ulli Steltzer announced she was leaving her Princeton photo studio, Brown and Elaine Miller Pilshaw took over the studio. In her first years of photography work Brown took classes, learned from Steltzer, and learned by doing. She specialized in wedding and portrait photography. Brown was said to be very good with people, asserting “the key to capturing great photos was not being noticed.”

She became a specialist in archival processing, specifically black and white prints, after her daughter Laura McPhee learned the technique in Emmet Gowin's laboratory and told her mother about it. Archival photographs are taken with a medium-format film camera and negatives are developed in the darkroom and printed on gelatin silver paper. Brown prefers black and white over color photography, stating that “color prints don’t last and will always fade.” Brown continued her father’s tradition by giving her daughter Laura McPhee her first camera and watched her develop into a well-known professional photographer. Brown often took on interns as part of her studio.

Feminism and advocacy work 

Following her divorce, Brown became an active member of the Central New Jersey Chapter of the National Organization for Women. A group of those women, including Joan Bartl, Rogie Stone Bender, Cynthia Eaton, Carol Portnoi Jacobs and Ann Stefan, formed a group called Women on Words and Images that studied books by major publishers. The group found that statistically both children's and adult books portrayed boys more often than girls. In these same children's books, boys were more often depicted as creative, whereas girls were shown taking part in domestic chores. In 1972, the group published its findings in the influential book, Dick and Jane as Victims, which was revised and republished in 1975. She then co-published Channeling Children: Sex Stereotyping on Prime Time TV with the same group in 1975.

References

External links 
 Inventory to the Women on Words and Images Records, Special Collections and University Archives, Rutgers University Libraries

Living people
American women photographers
Portrait photographers
1935 births